The Lal Bahadur Shastri Dam is also known as Almatti Dam is a hydroelectric project on the Krishna River in North Karnataka, India which was completed in July 2005. The target annual electric output of the dam is 560 MU (or GWh).

The Almatti Dam is the main reservoir of the Upper Krishna Irrigation Project; the 290 MW power station is located on the right side of the Almatti Dam. The facility uses vertical Kaplan turbines: five 55MW generators and one 15MW generator. Water is released in to the Narayanpur reservoir after using for power generation to serve the downstream irrigation needs. Two separate facilities namely, Almatti 1 Powerhouse and Almatti II Powerhouse each separated by distance do provide power generation capabilities.

During the initial stages of the project, estimated costs were projected as Rs.14.70 billion, but following the transfer of project's management to the Karnataka Power Corporation Limited (KPCL), the estimated cost was reduced by over fifty percent to Rs. 6.74 billion. KPCL eventually completed the project at an even lower cost of Rs. 5.20 billion. The entire dam was finished in less than forty months, with construction ending in July 2005.
The dam is located on the edge of Bijapur and Bagalkot districts. Geographically, it is located in the Bijapur district, but large areas of Bagalkot district have also been submerged due to filling of the reservoir. The dam holds a gross water storage capacity of 123.08 TMC at 519 meters MSL. The backwaters of the dam host several migratory birds during summer.

Height
The full reservoir level of Almatti dam was originally restricted to 160 meters MSL by the supreme court of India. The Krishna River conflict between Andhra Pradesh, Karnataka, and Maharashtra was resolved by the Brijesh Kumar Tribunal and the dam was authorized to be raised to the height of 524 meters MSL with nearly 200 TMC gross storage capacity.
26 different Radial spillway gates  are housed in the Dam.

See also
 Aihole
 Badami
 Banashankari
 Krishna Water Disputes Tribunal
 Kudalasangama
 Mahakuta
 North Karnataka
 Pattadakal
 Tourism in North Karnataka
 Upper Krishna Project
 Vijayapur
 List of dams and reservoirs in India

References

External links

 Almatti Dam Power House at Karnataka Power Corp
 Alamatti Dam

Dams in Karnataka
2005 establishments in Karnataka
Hydroelectric power stations in Karnataka
Reservoirs in Karnataka
Buildings and structures in Bijapur district
Geography of Bijapur district
Tourist attractions in Bijapur district
Dams completed in 2005